Yelujeh (also Romanized as Yelūjeh and  Yellūjeh; also known as Hija, Ilidzha, Ilija, Īljeh, and Yelījeh) is a village in Khanandabil-e Gharbi Rural District, in the Central District of Khalkhal County, Ardabil Province, Iran. At the 2006 census, its population was 252, in 55 families.

References 

Tageo

Towns and villages in Khalkhal County